Will Be Will Be is the third studio album by English alternative rock band Brigade, released on 31 May 2011 on Homespun Records by Pledgemusic.

Track listing
All lyrics are written by Will Simpson; all music is composed by Brigade.

"200 Scratches" - 3:32
"A Heinous Crime With Draconian Consequences" - 3:26
"Eden" - 3:27
"Adieu" - 3:18
"The Beating" - 3:00
"From Nothing Something Comes" - 3:00
"Sting Sting" - 4:00
"Laughter Lines" - 3:21
"It's A Mess (If It Ain't, It'll Do Till A Mess Gets Here)" - 3:58
"Tiny Pieces" - 4:32
"Find Your Own Way Home" - 6:23

Autumn Release
Brigade have confirmed by a posting on their facebook page that "Will Be Will Be" will receive a wider release in the autumn of 2011.

Reception

Personnel
The following personnel contributed to Will Be Will Be:
 Will Simpson - lead vocals, rhythm guitar, lyrics
 James Plant - lead guitar, backing vocals
 Naoto Hori - bass guitar
 Andrew Kearton - drums, percussion

References

2011 albums
Brigade (band) albums